Michel Joseph Kuehn (7 October 1923 – 18 September 2012) was a French prelate of the Catholic Church.

Michel Joseph Kuehn was born in Saint-Dié, France, ordained a priest on 12 July 1947 and appointed bishop of the Diocese of Chartres on 27 July 1978. He was ordained bishop on 30 September 1978, where he would remain until his resignation on 6 April 1991.

See also
Diocese of Chartres

External links
Catholic-Hierarchy
 Chartres Diocese (French)

20th-century Roman Catholic bishops in France
1923 births
2012 deaths